The Sevenoaks Suns are a basketball club and women's professional team from Sevenoaks, Kent, England. The Suns compete in the WBBL, the premier women's basketball competition in the United Kingdom, and are presently one of the most dominant teams in the women's domestic game.

Season-by-season records

Honours
Women's British Basketball League
Winners (3): 2017-2018, 2018-2019, 2020-2021,
WBBL Playoffs
Winners (3): 2016-2017, 2017-2018, 2018–2019
WBBL Trophy
Winners (1): 2016-2017
WBBL Cup
Winners (1): 2019-2020
Girls' Junior National Titles
Winners (24)

Current roster

References

Women's basketball teams in England
Women's sports teams in England
Women's British Basketball League teams
Sport in Kent
Sevenoaks
Basketball teams established in 2005
2005 establishments in England